Robert Douglas Robinson (born April 19, 1967) is a Canadian former professional ice hockey player who played 22 games in the National Hockey League.  He played with the St. Louis Blues. He is the son of the former NHL player, Doug Robinson.

Career statistics

References 

1967 births
Living people
Canadian ice hockey defencemen
Frankfurt Lions players
Houston Aeros (1994–2013) players
Kalamazoo Wings (1974–2000) players
Manchester Storm (1995–2002) players
Miami RedHawks men's ice hockey players
Peoria Rivermen (IHL) players
Sportspeople from St. Catharines
St. Louis Blues draft picks
St. Louis Blues players
Syracuse Crunch players
VEU Feldkirch players
Ice hockey people from Ontario